William Wachob (born April 8, 1953) is a former Democratic member of the Pennsylvania House of Representatives.

References

Democratic Party members of the Pennsylvania House of Representatives
Living people
1953 births
People from Ridgway, Pennsylvania